Edmund Hitt (February 9, 1901 – July 17, 1976) was a member of the Wisconsin State Assembly.

Biography
Hitt was born in  the town of Alma, Buffalo County, Wisconsin, and was the younger brother of the politician Arthur A. Hitt. He attended the University of Wisconsin-La Crosse. Hitt was a farmer and farm labor investigator. He was also involved with the Tenney Telephone Company. He died on July 17, 1976, in Wabasha, Minnesota.

Career
Hitt was chairman of the Town of Alma from 1936 to 1943 and mayor of the city of Alma from 1946 to 1948. In 1942, he was an unsuccessful candidate for the Assembly as a member of the Wisconsin Progressive Party. He was elected to the Assembly in 1948 as a Republican.

References

External links

People from Alma, Wisconsin
Businesspeople from Wisconsin
Farmers from Wisconsin
Mayors of places in Wisconsin
Wisconsin Progressives (1924)
University of Wisconsin–La Crosse alumni
1901 births
1976 deaths
20th-century American businesspeople
20th-century American politicians
Republican Party members of the Wisconsin State Assembly